Stone in Oxney is a village south of Ashford in Kent, South East England, in the civil parish of Stone-cum-Ebony near Appledore.

The stone that gives the village its name is preserved in the village church, and is of Roman origin. Often thought to be an altar of Mithras, it in fact depicts Apis.

The Saxon Shore Way, a long-distance walking route tracing the old Saxon shoreline, passes through the parish.

References

Villages in Kent
Villages in the Borough of Ashford